Roy Astor Strandbakke (12 October 1930 – 22 April 2021) was a Norwegian footballer who played as a midfielder for Raufoss IL, amassing 629 games across all competitions. He represented Norway as a B and senior international.

He died on 22 April 2021 at the age of 90.

References

1930 births
2021 deaths
People from Vestre Toten
Norwegian footballers
Association football midfielders
Norway international footballers
Raufoss IL players
Sportspeople from Innlandet